Newell Township is one of sixteen townships in Buena Vista County, Iowa, USA.  As of the 2000 census, its population was 1,183.

Geography
According to the USGS, it contains four cemeteries: Cooke, First M E Church, Newell Catholic and Newell.

References

External links
 US-Counties.com
 City-Data.com

Townships in Buena Vista County, Iowa
Townships in Iowa